Mont-Saint-Michel (Norman: Mont Saint Miché;) is a tidal island and mainland commune in Normandy, France.

, the island had a population of 29.

The commune's position—on an island just a few hundred metres from land—made it accessible at low tide to the many pilgrims to its abbey, but defensible as an incoming tide stranded, drove off, or drowned would-be assailants. The island remained unconquered during the Hundred Years' War; a small garrison fended off a full attack by the English in 1433. Louis XI recognised the reverse benefits of its natural defence and turned it into a prison. The abbey was used regularly as a prison during the Ancien Régime.

Mont-Saint-Michel and its surrounding bay were inscribed on the UNESCO list of World Heritage Sites in 1979 for its unique aesthetic and importance as a medieval Christian site. It is visited by more than three million people each year. Over 60 buildings within the commune are protected in France as monuments historiques.

Geography

Formation
Now a rocky tidal island, the Mont occupied dry land in prehistoric times. As sea levels rose, erosion reshaped the coastal landscape, and several outcrops of granite emerged in the bay, having resisted the wear and tear of the ocean better than the surrounding rocks. These included Lillemer, the Mont Dol, Tombelaine (the island just to the north), and Mont Tombe, later called Mont-Saint-Michel.

Mont-Saint-Michel consists of leucogranite which solidified from an underground intrusion of molten magma about 525 million years ago, during the Cambrian period, as one of the younger parts of the Mancellian granitic batholith. (Early studies of Mont-Saint-Michel by French geologists sometimes describe the leucogranite of the Mont as "granulite", but this granitic meaning of granulite is now obsolete.)

Tides
Popularly nicknamed "St. Michael in peril of the sea" by medieval pilgrims making their way across the flats, the mount can still pose dangers for visitors who avoid the causeway and attempt the hazardous walk across the sands from the neighbouring coast.

Polderisation and occasional flooding have created salt marsh meadows that were found to be ideally suited to grazing sheep. The well-flavoured meat that results from the diet of the sheep in the pré salé (salt meadow) makes agneau de pré-salé (salt meadow lamb) a local specialty that may be found on the menus of restaurants that depend on income from the many visitors to the mount.

Tidal island

The connection between the Mont-Saint-Michel and the mainland has changed over the centuries. Previously connected by a tidal causeway uncovered only at low tide, this was converted into a raised causeway in 1879, preventing the tide from scouring the silt around the mount. The coastal flats have also been polderised to create pastureland, decreasing the distance between the shore and the island, and the Couesnon River has been canalised, reducing the dispersion of the flow of water. These factors all encouraged silting-up of the bay.

On 16 June 2006, the French prime minister and regional authorities announced a €200 million project to build a hydraulic dam using the waters of the Couesnon and the tides to help remove the accumulated silt, and to make Mont-Saint-Michel an island again. The construction of the dam began in 2009. The project also includes the removal of the causeway and its visitor car park. Visitors can walk or use shuttles to cross the causeway.

On 22 July 2014, the new bridge by architect Dietmar Feichtinger was opened to the public. The light bridge allows the waters to flow freely around the island and improves the efficiency of the now operational dam. The project, which cost €209 million, was officially opened by President François Hollande.

On rare occasions, tidal circumstances produce an extremely high "supertide". The new bridge was completely submerged on 21 March 2015 by the highest sea level, for a once-in-18-years occurrence, as crowds gathered to snap photos.

History
Mont-Saint-Michel was used in the sixth and seventh centuries as an Armorican stronghold of Gallo-Roman culture and power until it was ransacked by the Franks, thus ending the trans-channel culture that had stood since the departure of the Romans in 460. From roughly the fifth to the eighth century, Mont-Saint-Michel belonged to the territory of Neustria and, in the early ninth century, was an important place in the marches of Neustria.

 
Before the construction of the first monastic establishment in the 8th century, the island was called Mont Tombe. According to a legend, the archangel Michael appeared in 708 to Aubert of Avranches, the bishop of Avranches, and instructed him to build a church on the rocky islet.

Unable to defend his kingdom against the assaults of the Vikings, the king of the Franks agreed to grant the Cotentin peninsula and the Avranchin, including Mont-Saint-Michel traditionally linked to the city of Avranches, to the Bretons in the Treaty of Compiègne. This marked the beginning of a brief period of Breton possession of the Mont. In fact, these lands and Mont-Saint-Michel were never really included in the duchy of Brittany and remained independent bishoprics from the newly created Breton archbishopric of Dol. When Rollo confirmed Franco as archbishop of Rouen, these traditional dependences of the Rouen archbishopric were retained in it.

The mount gained strategic significance again in 933 when William I Longsword annexed the Cotentin Peninsula from the weakened Duchy of Brittany. This made the mount definitively part of Normandy, and is depicted in the Bayeux Tapestry, which commemorates the 1066 Norman conquest of England. Harold Godwinson is pictured on the tapestry rescuing two Norman knights from the quicksand in the tidal flats during the conflict against Conan II, Duke of Brittany. Norman ducal patronage financed the spectacular Norman architecture of the abbey in subsequent centuries.

In 1067 the monastery of Mont-Saint-Michel gave its support to William the Conqueror in his claim to the throne of England. This he rewarded with properties and grounds on the English side of the Channel, including a small island off the southwestern coast of Cornwall which was modelled after the Mount and became a Norman priory named St Michael's Mount of Penzance.

During the Hundred Years' War, the Kingdom of England made repeated assaults on the island but was unable to seize it due to the abbey's improved fortifications. The English initially besieged the Mont in 1423–24, and then again in 1433–34 with English forces under the command of Thomas de Scales, 7th Baron Scales. Two wrought-iron bombards that Scales abandoned when he gave up his siege are still on site. They are known as les Michelettes. Mont-Saint-Michel's resolute resistance inspired the French, especially Joan of Arc.

When Louis XI of France founded the Order of Saint Michael in 1469, he intended that the abbey church of Mont-Saint-Michel become the chapel for the order, but because of its great distance from Paris, his intention could never be realized.

The wealth and influence of the abbey extended to many daughter foundations, including St. Michael's Mount in Cornwall. However, its popularity and prestige as a centre of pilgrimage waned with the Reformation, and by the time of the French Revolution there were scarcely any monks in residence. The abbey was closed and converted into a prison, initially to hold clerical opponents of the republican regime. High-profile political prisoners followed, but by 1836, influential figures—including Victor Hugo—had launched a campaign to restore what was seen as a national architectural treasure. The prison was finally closed in 1863.

In 1872, the highly decorated French architect of historic monuments, Édouard Corroyer, was responsible for assessing the condition of the Mont. It took him about two years to convince his minister to classify Mont-Saint-Michel a historic monument, and it was officially declared as such in 1874. From then on, this highly qualified and educated architect and member of the Academy of Fine Arts devoted himself entirely to the restoration of "la Merveille". Under his direction, gigantic works were undertaken, starting with the most urgent and devoted fifteen years of his life to this work. He wrote four works on the building and his name remains forever attached to the "resurrection" of Mont-Saint-Michel.

During the occupation of France in WWII, German soldiers occupied Mont-Saint-Michel, where they used St. Auburn church as a lookout post. The island was a major attraction for German tourists and soldiers with around 325,000 German tourists from July 18, 1940, to the end of the occupation of France. After the initial D-Day invasion by the allies, many exhausted German soldiers retreated to strongholds like Mont-Saint-Michel. On August 1, 1944, Allied troops entered the Mont-Saint-Michel. They were accompanied by two British reporters, Gault MacGowan of the New York Sun and Paul Holt with the London Daily Express, and crowds of jubilant French locals.

Mont-Saint-Michel and its bay were added to the UNESCO list of World Heritage Sites in 1979, and it was listed with criteria such as cultural, historical, and architectural significance, as well as human-created and natural beauty.

Abbey design

In the 11th century, William of Volpiano, the Italian architect who had built Fécamp Abbey in Normandy, was chosen by Richard II, Duke of Normandy, to be the building contractor. He designed the Romanesque church of the abbey, daringly placing the transept crossing at the top of the mount. Many underground crypts and chapels had to be built to compensate for this weight; these formed the basis for the supportive upward structure that can be seen today. Today Mont-Saint-Michel is seen as a building of Romanesque architecture.

Robert de Thorigny, a great supporter of Henry II of England (who was also Duke of Normandy), reinforced the structure of the buildings and built the main façade of the church in the 12th century. In 1204, Guy of Thouars, regent for the Duchess of Brittany, as vassal of the King of France, undertook a siege of the Mount. After having set fire to the village and having massacred the population, he was obliged to beat a retreat under the powerful walls of the abbey. Unfortunately, the fire which he himself lit extended to the buildings, and the roofs fell prey to the flames. Horrified by the cruelty and the exactions of his Breton ally, Philip Augustus offered Abbot Jordan a grant for the reconstruction of the abbey in the new Gothic architectural style.

Charles VI is credited with adding major fortifications to the abbey-mount, building towers, successive courtyards, and strengthening the ramparts.

Development

Administration

The islet belongs to the French commune of Le Mont-Saint-Michel, in the département of Manche, in Normandy. The nearest significant town, with an SNCF train station, is Pontorson, with a population of slightly over 4,000. Le Mont-Saint-Michel belongs to the Organization of World Heritage Cities.

Population

Up to 20,000 people visit the city during the summer months. Among the 43 inhabitants , five were monks and seven nuns.

The Monastic Fraternities of Jerusalem
Since 24 June 2001, following the appeal addressed to them in 2000 by Bishop Jacques Fihey, Bishop of Coutances and Avranches, a community of monks and nuns of the Monastic Fraternities of Jerusalem, sent from the mother-house of St-Gervais-et-St-Protais in Paris, have been living as a community on Mont-Saint-Michel. They replaced the Benedictine monks who returned to the Mount in 1966. They are tenants of the centre for national monuments and are not involved in the management of the abbey.

The community has seven sisters and four brothers. They live the mission that the Church has entrusted to them in their own charism of being "in the heart of the world" to be "in the heart of God". Their life revolves around prayer, work and fraternal life. The community meets four times a day to recite the liturgical office in the abbey itself (or in the crypt of Notre-Dame des Trente Cierges in winter). In this way, the building keeps its original purpose as a place of prayer and singing the glory of God. The presence of the community attracts many visitors and pilgrims who come to join in the various liturgical celebrations.

In 2012, the community undertook the renovation of a house on the Mount, the Logis Saint-Abraham, which is used as a guest house for pilgrims on retreat.

People and places of note
 Robert of Torigni, famous abbot of the Mount; 
 The Duke of Chartres (later Louis-Philippe I) came to demolish the "iron cage"; 
 Louis Auguste Blanqui, political prisoner in the Mount; 
 Armand Barbès, political prisoner in the Mount; 
 La Mère Poulard, famous omelet restaurant;
 Anne Boutiaut Poulard, creator of the Omelette de la mère Poulard.

Economy
The Mont-Saint-Michel has long "belonged" to some families who shared the businesses in the town and succeeded to the village administration. Tourism is almost the sole source of income of the commune. Tourism brings about $63 million to the small island. There are about 50 shops for three million tourists. Only about 25 people sleep every night on the Mount (monks included), except for those in hotels. The main institutions are shared by:
 Eric Vannier, owner of the group the Mère Poulard (holding half of restaurants, shops, hotels and three museums);
 Jean-Yves Vételé, CEO of Sodetour (five hotels, a supermarket and shops—all extramural—including Mercury Barracks);
 Patrick Gaul, former elected official, hotelier and intramural restaurateur;
 Independent merchants.

Twin towns and sister cities
 Hatsukaichi, Hiroshima, Japan, where Itsukushima Shrine, another UNESCO World Heritage Site, is located.

Historically, Mont-Saint-Michel was the Norman counterpart of St Michael's Mount in Cornwall, UK, which was given to the Benedictines, religious order of Mont-Saint-Michel, by Edward the Confessor in the 11th century. The two mounts share the same tidal island characteristics and a similar conical shape, though Mont-Saint-Michel is much taller.

Modern pilgrimage

During the medieval period, pilgrims walked from Italy, Germany and England, as well as other parts of France. Such devotees were known as Miquelots. Modern pilgrims can follow the same routes. Ten hiking trails have been created that enable pilgrims from various European countries to retrace the path their ancestors may have taken during a medieval pilgrimage.

In popular culture
Mont-Saint-Michel served as an artistic inspiration for a number of works. Part of the action in Helen MacInnes's 1943 film thriller Assignment in Brittany takes place at the Mont, including a dramatic nighttime chase across the sands. In Peter Jackson's 2003 film The Lord of the Rings: The Return of the King, Gondor's capital city, Minas Tirith, was modelled on Mont-Saint-Michel. The site appeared in the 2004 film Mickey, Donald, Goofy: The Three Musketeers. Likewise, the town and castle in the 2010 Disney hit film Tangled were based on Mont-Saint-Michel, as was the design of the 2011 video game Dark Souls location New Londo Ruins. Terrance Malick’s 2013 feature film To the Wonder features the abbey in its opening scenes. A mission in 2022 video game Sniper Elite 5 features an abbey that closely resembles Mont-Saint-Michel.

See also

 Aragonese Castle
 Carolingian architecture
 Carolingian art
 French Romanesque architecture
 Key Monastery
 La Mère Poulard
 Le Mont Saint Michel (clothing), clothing brand named after the abbey
 List of Carolingian monasteries
 Manoir de Brion
 Monemvasia
 Mont-Saint-Michel Abbey
 Saint-Malo
 Saint Michael in the Catholic Church
 St Michael's Mount, Cornwall

References

External links

 Mont Saint-Michel：A World Heritage Site
 Freeing Mont Saint-Michel
Mont-Saint-Michel Celebrates 1,300 yrs of History
Mont Saint-Michel between history and legends
 Official Mont-Saint-Michel Tourist site (English version) 
 Virtual recreation of Mont St. Michel in Second Life
 Pano at 360° of Mont St Michel
 High-resolution 360° Panoramas and Images of Mont Saint-Michel | Art Atlas
 The Sledge Tramway

Buildings and structures in Manche
Car-free zones in Europe
Carolingian architecture
Churches in Manche
Communes of Manche
Islands of Normandy
Landmarks in France
Ramsar sites in Metropolitan France
Tidal islands of France
Tourist attractions in Manche
Fortified settlements
World Heritage Sites in France
Michael (archangel)
Peaks dedicated to Michael (archangel)
Landforms of Normandy
7 Most Endangered Programme
Populated coastal places in France